David Moreno is an American musician, singer, audio engineer, songwriter and producer, best known for his role as the drummer in the American rock band Puddle of Mudd.

Early life and education
Born in Sun Valley, Los Angeles, California, Moreno is of Mexican descent. He first started playing drums when he was only 11, and at just 15 years old, Moreno was already performing his first gig at the famous iconic Whisky a Go Go nightclub on the Sunset Strip in Hollywood, California.

Moreno's musical education continued when he attended The Dick Grove School of Music upon completing high school. There, he graduated from the Percussion Program after studying hand percussion, ear training and music theory, as well as many genres of music which encompassed everything from Rock, Metal, Jazz, Disco, Latin, Hip Hop, Funk, and Fusion to Orchestra, Big Band, R&B and Country.

Career
Moreno has recorded more than 100 records which include movie soundtracks, instructional CDs, karaoke and television commercials. In 2008, he contributed the studio drum piece for the theme song to the Dr. Phil show.

Moreno's professional in-studio affiliations include names such as: Bill Appleberry (The Wallflowers, Puddle of Mudd), David Kahne (Paul McCartney, Sugar Ray, Rolling Stones), Johnny K (Disturbed, 3 Doors Down), Roy Z (Judas Priest, Bruce Dickinson), Andy Johns (Led Zeppelin), Greg Hampton (Alice Cooper, Lita Ford) and Richard Podolor (Three Dog Night, Michelle Branch).

Moreno has also recorded and toured worldwide with an eclectic array of musical artists including:
Bruce Dickinson – Iron Maiden,
Dizzy Reed – Guns N' Roses,
Steve Stevens – Billy Idol,
Earshot – Warner Bros,
Operator – Atlantic Records,
Rob Rock,
Judas Priest,
Tribe of Gypsies – JVC/Victor,
Love/Hate,
Ice-T's Body Count,
Phil Lewis – L.A. Guns,
Vampiro X-Mana,
Christian Castro,
Belinda and
María José.

In January 2016, Dave was chosen to be included in the elite line-up of performers at the NAMM 'Bonzo Bash' - an annual event honoring the late, great drummer, John Bonham of Led Zeppelin.  There, he took the stage alongside other top-industry professionals, performing "The Immigrant Song" during the show.

Present projects
 
Currently, in addition to touring with Puddle of Mudd and working on recording a new album with the band, Moreno also owns and operates a full production Recording Studio in Los Angeles called Doom Room Studio where he teaches, produces, records, and mixes independent and national artists, television and film. Previous clients of Moreno's have included Nick Simmons (Gene Simmons Family Jewels), Roy Z (Halford, Dickinson), Brent Woods (Vince Neil, Sebastian Bach), Vinny Appice (Black Sabbath), Kelly Rhoads, Chas West (The Jason Bonham Band, Foreigner), Copper Mountain, The Doo Wah Riders, Bobby Blotzer (Ratt), Jizzy Pearl (Quiet Riot), and Afterhours.

Discography

Equipment

Drums – DW

18 X 22 22 
10, 12, 14, 16 – Toms / Floor Toms
6.5 x 14 Snare  – Maple Wood and one spare

Cymbals – Sabian

1 – 17 " AAXplsion Crash
2 – 18 " AAXplosion Crashes
1 – 19 " AAXplosion Crash
1 – 21 " AA Rock Ride
1 – 14 " AA Brilliant Studio or Stage Hats

Hardware

1 – DW 5000 Snare Stand
1 – Low to ground – Drum Throne
1 – DW 5000 or 9000 Hi Hat Stand
1 – DW 5000 or 9000 DW DBL Bass Pedal
5 – DW Cymbal Boom Crash Hardware Stands

Accessories

1 – Shure 58 – Vocal Mic
1 – Drum Rug (if necessary)
1 – DI Box

References

External links
 

American rock drummers
Living people
People from Sun Valley, Los Angeles
Puddle of Mudd members
Year of birth missing (living people)